Thomas Russell Ferrie Heron (born 31 March 1936) is a Scottish former footballer. Born in Irvine, he played as an outside left for Queen's Park before being moved to left-back by Manchester United. He moved to York City in 1961, where he made almost 200 league appearances.

References

1936 births
Living people
Footballers from Irvine, North Ayrshire
Scottish footballers
Association football fullbacks
Association football outside forwards
Queen's Park F.C. players
Kilmarnock F.C. players
Portadown F.C. players
Manchester United F.C. players
York City F.C. players
Altrincham F.C. players
Hyde United F.C. players
Droylsden F.C. players
Scottish Football League players
English Football League players